Pothos Argyros or Argyrus was a Byzantine commander, who served as the catepan of Italy during the eventful years of 1029 to 1031. 

Nasr succeeded in being set free after promising assistance to Pothos' superior, the doux of Antioch, Michael Spondyles.

Following the rise to the throne of Romanos III Argyros, Pothos was appointed Catepan of Italy in 1029. Pothos' relation to Romanos III is unknown, but according to the historians Jean-Claude Ceynet and Jean-François Vannier, he may have been his nephew. A surviving lead seal of office gives his titles as "protospatharios and katepano [catepan] of Italy".

According to Lupus Protospatharius, he arrived at Bari as the new Catepan of Italy in July 1029, and immediately fought in its vicinity against the Muslim commander Rayca, who had previously forced the capitulation of the fortress of Obbianum (probably modern Uggiano). Lupus then reports that in 1031 (or 1032, according to some modern interpretations), he faced another invasion by the Emirate of Sicily. The Italian chroniclers report that the Muslims sacked Cassano in June, and that, hurrying to confront them, on 3 July, Pothos Argyros was defeated and killed.

Pothos' death in battle is not entirely certain, however, since an inventory of the metropolitan see of Reggio di Calabria includes a set of panegyrics offered by kyr Pothos and his wife, both related to a possession of a katepanissa Theoktiste. An identification of Theoktiste with the wife of kyr Pothos, and of Pothos with the catepan is very likely, but the copyist of the works recorded that this was done in 1033/34, "during the times of catepan Pothos, under the reign of Romanos and Zoe", by which time Pothos is supposed to have been dead.

References

Sources
 
 
 

11th-century catepans of Italy
Pothos
Byzantine people of the Arab–Byzantine wars
Byzantines killed in battle
Protospatharioi